Puccinia is a genus of fungi. All species in this genus are obligate plant pathogens and are known as rusts. The genus contains about 4000 species.

The genus name of Puccinia is in honour of Tommaso Puccini (died 1735), who was an Italian doctor and botanist who taught Anatomy at Hospital of Santa Maria Nuova in Florence. 

The genus was circumscribed by Pier Antonio Micheli in Nov. Pl. Gen. on page 213 in 1729.

Taxonomy 

Examples of Puccinia rusts and the diseases they cause:
 Puccinia asparagi - Asparagus rust
 Puccinia graminis - Stem rust, also known as black rust
 Puccinia horiana - Chrysanthemum white rust
 Puccinia mariae-wilsoniae - Spring beauty rust
 Puccinia poarum - Coltsfoot rust gall
 Puccinia psidii - Guava rust or eucalyptus rust
 Puccinia recondita - Brown rust
 Puccinia sessilis - Arum rust and Ransoms rust
 Puccinia striiformis - Stripe rust, also known as yellow rust
 Puccinia triticina - Wheat leaf rust, also known as brown rust
 Puccinia punctiformis - Canada thistle rust

The rust species Puccinia obtegens has shown some promise for controlling Canada thistle, but it must be used in conjunction with other control measures to be effective.

Another leaf rust species, Puccinia myrsiphylli, has been used as an effective  biocontrol agent for infestations of the common form of bridal creeper (Asparagus asparagoides) in Australia since 2000.

References

External links 

 A collection of information regarding Puccinia psidii—particularly with respect to its presence in Hawaii
  - A collection of references to other genomics resources, on stem, yellow, and leaf rusts.

 
Fungal plant pathogens and diseases
Taxa named by Christiaan Hendrik Persoon
Basidiomycota genera